The Besleti Bridge also known as the Queen Tamar's Bridge is a medieval arched stone bridge at Sukhumi, Georgia’s breakaway republic of Abkhazia.

Located some 6 km from the city centre, the bridge spans the small mountain River Besletka, and dates back to the late 12th century. Thirty-five meters in overall length (the arch itself is 13.3 m) and eight meters high, this single-arch bridge is one of the most illustrative examples of the medieval bridge design popular during the reign of Tamar of Georgia (r. 1184-1213) who is traditionally credited to have commissioned the construction of the Beslet bridge. A contemporary inscription in the early Georgian asomtavruli alphabet reads: "Christ the Lord, glorify in every possible way in both lives." An engraved cross and the Greek Τ have survived in the lower part of the left pillar of the bridge. A stone stele with Georgian inscriptions stood at the head of the bridge, but was lost during the War in Abkhazia early in the 1990s. In the vicinity of the bridge are ruins of medieval defense towers, a testimony to strategic importance of the locality.

Bridge of Besleti has been given the status of national importance monument.

Sources 
 Tsitsishvili, I., Ukleba, D. "Besleti", in:  Georgian Soviet Encyclopedia, vol. 2, pp. 341–2. Tbilisi, 1977
 Lidiia Dubinskaia (1985), The Soviet Union: A Guide & Reference Book, p. 283. Raduga Publishers
 Cultural heritage in Abkhazia, Tbilisi, 2015

Bridges completed in the 12th century
Bridges in Georgia (country)
Transport in Abkhazia
Buildings and structures in Abkhazia
Immovable Cultural Monuments of National Significance of Georgia
Arch bridges
Stone bridges